Equus conversidens, or the Mexican horse, is a dubious Pleistocene species of horse, now extinct, that inhabited North America.

The holotype of Equus conversidens, a partial palate, was unearthed in Pleistocene deposits northeast of Mexico City, Mexico. In January 1963, a partial skeleton was found in the city of Canyon, Texas in a white clay bed during the excavation of a basement, and was referred to E. conversidens by Dalquest and Hughes (1965), who interpreted the species as medium to small-sized, and added additional records of the species from Texas (including a skeleton from Slaton), Arizona, New Mexico, Oklahoma, Kansas and Florida, synonymizing Equus francisci, Equus tau, E. littoralis, E. achates, and E. barcenaei with E. conversidens. However, Winans (1985) and MacFadden (1992) challenged the validity of E. conversidens due to its minimal diagnostic value, and treated E. francisci as valid. Subsequent study confirmed the nomen dubium status of E. conversidens because the holotype was undiagnostic besides its small size.

See also
Evolution of the horse
Equus alaskae

References

Pleistocene mammals of North America
Taxa named by Richard Owen
Fossil taxa described in 1869
Equus (genus)